Tom A. Viezee (born 1950) is a Dutch Christian minister and former politician.

As a member of the Reformatory Political Federation Viezee was a councillor of Alphen aan den Rijn from 1990 to 1999. From 1993 to 1994 he also was an alderman and from 1994 to 1999 also RPF fraction leader.

On behalf of the RPF and later on for its successor the ChristianUnion he became mayor of Zeewolde on March 1, 1999. He stayed mayor till October 1, 2004 when he stepped down and became pastor in the Netherlands Reformed Churches in Krommenie on February 20, 2005. He was able to do so because he had been studying theology at VU University Amsterdam in the early 90s.

Personal life 
Tom Viezee is married and has three children. Although a member of the Netherlands Reformed Churches he originates from the Dutch Reformed Church.

References 
  Burgemeester kiest kansel boven ketting, Kerknieuws.nl, May 21, 2004
  'Straks niet heel andere Ton Viezee op preekstoel', Nederlands Dagblad, May 22, 2004

1950 births
Living people
Aldermen in South Holland
People from Alphen aan den Rijn
Christian Union (Netherlands) politicians
21st-century Dutch politicians
Netherlands Reformed Churches Christians from the Netherlands
Mayors in Flevoland
Municipal councillors in South Holland
People from Zaanstad
People from Zeewolde
Reformatory Political Federation politicians
Vrije Universiteit Amsterdam alumni
21st-century Dutch Calvinist and Reformed ministers